The cabinet of Mexico is the Executive Cabinet and is a part of the executive branch of the Mexican government. It consists of nineteen Secretaries of State and the Legal Counsel of the Federal Executive.

In addition to the legal Executive Cabinet there are other Cabinet-level administration offices that report directly to the President of the Republic (Gabinete Ampliado). Officials from the legal and extended Cabinet (Gabinete Legal y Ampliado) are subordinate to the President.

Constitutional and legal basis 

The term "Cabinet" does not appear in the Constitution, where reference is made only to the Secretaries of State.   Article 89 of the Constitution provides that the President of Mexico can appoint and remove Secretaries of State.

The Executive Cabinet does not play a collective legislative or executive role (as do the Cabinets in parliamentary systems). The main interaction that Cabinet members have with the legislative branch are regular testimonials before Congressional committees to justify their actions, and coordinate executive and legislative policy in their respective fields of jurisdiction.

Secretary selection process 
Cabinet members are freely appointed by the President, except for the Secretary of the Treasury and the Secretary of Foreign Affairs, whose appointments must be approved by the Chamber of Deputies and the Senate respectively.

Cabinet Secretaries are often selected from past and current governors, senators, and other political office holders.  Private citizens such as businessmen or former military officials are also common Cabinet choices.

It is not rare for a Secretary to be moved from one Secretariat to another. For example, former Secretary of Energy Fernando Canales Clariond had previously served as Secretary of Economy and former Secretary of Education Josefina Vázquez Mota had previously served as Secretary of Social Development.

Cabinet and Cabinet-level officials

Cabinet

Cabinet-level administration offices 

Some positions are not part of the legal Executive Cabinet, but have cabinet-level rank  therefore their incumbents are considered members of the extended cabinet (Gabinete ampliado).

Some of the cabinet-level administration offices are:

References

External links 
Executive Cabinet
CIA: Chiefs of State and Cabinet Members of Mexico

 
Mexico
Executive branch of the government of Mexico